USS Coyote (SP-84) was United States Navy patrol boat, training vessel and supply boat in commission from 1917 to 1919.
 
Coyote was a civilian motorboat completed in 1897. The U.S. Navy purchased her from her owner, Sylvester Sparling of Evanston, Illinois, for World War I service on 7 April 1917 and commissioned her as USS Coyote (SP-84) the same day.

Coyote was assigned to the 9th Naval District for patrol duty at Great Lakes Naval Training Station at Great Lakes, Illinois, and at Chicago, Illinois. She also was used also to instruct enlisted men and transport supplies, being laid up each winter when the Great Lakes iced over.

Coyote was stricken from the Navy List on 17 June 1919 and sold on 13 December 1919.

References

Department of the Navy: Naval Historical Center: Online Library of Selected Images: Civilian Ships: Coyote (American Motor Boat, 1897) Served as USS Coyote (SP-84) in 1917-1919
NavSource Online: Section Patrol Craft Photo Archive: Coyote (SP 84)

Patrol vessels of the United States Navy
World War I patrol vessels of the United States
1897 ships